Midjil is a Mandal in Mahbubnagar district, Telangana.

Institutions
 Zilla Parishad High school
 New sun rise school
 Government Junior College
 Slate Grammar School
 Chaitanya Bharati High School
 Sri venkateshwara vocational junior college
 St. Mary's E/M High School

Villages
The villages in Midjil mandal include:
 Ayyawaripally 	
 Bhairampalle 	
 Boinpally
 Bommarasipalle 	
 Chiluveru/ Ranipet/ Reddyguda	
 Donur 	
 Jakinalapalle 	
 Kanchanpalle 	
 Kothapalle 	
 Kothur 	
 Mallapoor
 Masigundlapally 	
 Midjil 	
 Munnanur 	
 Rachalpally
 Ramreddypally 	
 Revally 	
 Singamdoddi
 Valabaraopalle 	
 Vaspula 	
 Velgommula 	
 Vemula 	
 Wadyal
 Chennampally

References

Mandals in Mahbubnagar district